Edward Crofton may refer to:

Edward Crofton, 2nd Baron Crofton (1806–1869), Anglo-Irish Conservative politician
Sir Edward Crofton, 2nd Baronet (1748–1797), Irish politician
Edward Crofton (cricketer) (1854–1882), English cricketer
Sir Edward Crofton, 1st Baronet (1624–1675), of the Crofton baronets
Sir Edward Crofton, 2nd Baronet (died 1729) (c. 1662–1729), Irish landowner and politician
Sir Edward Crofton, 3rd Baronet (1687–1739), of the Crofton baronets
Sir Edward Crofton, 4th Baronet (1713–1745), of the Crofton baronets
Sir Edward Crofton, 3rd Baronet (1778–1816), of the Crofton baronets

See also
Crofton (disambiguation)